Caroline Leonetti Ahmanson (April 12, 1918 – June 21, 2005) was an American fashion consultant, businesswoman and philanthropist. She was a corporate director of The Walt Disney Company and the Fluor Corporation. She served as Chairman of the Federal Reserve Bank of San Francisco from 1981 to 1984. She was the founder of the Los Angeles County High School for the Arts and trustee of the Los Angeles County Museum of Art.

Early life 
Caroline Leonetti was born on April 12, 1918, in San Francisco, California. She graduated from the University of California, Berkeley in Berkeley, California and the California School of Design in San Francisco.

Career
Ahmanson started her career as a fashion consultant on the radio and in television, particularly on Art Linkletter's program. In 1945, she founded Caroline Leonetti Ltd., a modeling agency in Los Angeles. It was purchased by Raphael Berko and renamed Media Artists Group in 1987.

From 1981 to 1984, she served as Chairman of the Federal Reserve Bank of San Francisco. During her tenure, she suggested changes in its discount rate.

She served on the Boards of Directors of The Walt Disney Company, the Fluor Corporation and Carter Hawley Hale Stores (later known as Broadway Stores). She also served on the City of Los Angeles Economic Advisory Council. Additionally, she served as Senior Vice Chairman of the Los Angeles Area Chamber of Commerce.

Philanthropy
Ahmanson served on the National Advisory Council of the Peace Corps. She was appointed by President Richard Nixon to serve on the National Committee on United States–China Relations. She served as its Vice Chairman. In this capacity, she helped the Chinese government better understand how to take care of the disabled. In fact, a dinner conversation she had with Deng Pufang, Deng Xiaoping's son, led to a research trip sponsored by the National Committee and a meeting between Deng and President Ronald Reagan (when he was President) in the White House to talk about better treatment of the disabled. She was a co-founder of the Los Angeles-Guangzhou Sister City Committee. She served as its Chairman, and appointed Katrina Leung as its President.

Later, she was appointed by President Reagan to serve on the President's Committee on the Arts and Humanities. She was also appointed to the National Council on the Humanities and the California Arts Commission. She then served on the President's Council of the Richard Nixon Presidential Library and Museum in Yorba Linda, California.

She became the first female member of the Rotary Club of Los Angeles in 1987, having received its Distinguished Citizen of the Year award in 1985. She served as Vice Chairman of the Board of Directors of the Los Angeles World Affairs Council. In 1985, she founded the Los Angeles County High School for the Arts in Los Angeles. She later served on the board of trustees of the Los Angeles County Museum of Art (LACMA) and the Los Angeles Music Center. She was a recipient of the Phoenix Award from the USC Pacific Asia Museum in Pasadena, California. In January, she established the Los Angeles Music Center's Caroline Leonetti Ahmanson Endowment Fund for Arts Education as a result of a charity dinner which raised $450,000 at the Beverly Wilshire Hotel in January, 1998. Moreover, she served as Vice Chair of the Los Angeles Music Center Education Division from 1979 until her death. She also co-hosted fundraisers for The Salvation Army.

Personal life
Ahmanson married her first husband, Bernhardt Paul Heim (1917–2007), in 1940. They had a daughter, Margo O'Connell.

In 1965, Ahmanson married husband Howard Fieldstead Ahmanson Sr. (1906-1968), the founder of H.F. Ahmanson & Co., an insurance and savings and loans company. She became a widow when he died in 1968, and moved into a penthouse suite at the Beverly Wilshire Hotel in Beverly Hills, California.

Death
She died of Alzheimer's disease-related complications on Tuesday, June 21, 2005 in Beverly Hills, California. She was 87.

Legacy
The Ahmanson Theatre in Los Angeles was named in her honor.
The Leonetti/O'Connell Family Foundation, formerly known as the Caroline Leonetti Ahmanson Foundation, was founded in 1993. It donates US$2 million every year.

References

American corporate directors
Philanthropists from California
1918 births
2005 deaths
Women corporate directors
Directors of The Walt Disney Company
Federal Reserve Bank people
Ahmanson, Caroline Leonetti
Businesspeople from San Francisco
People from Beverly Hills, California
San Francisco Art Institute alumni
University of California, Berkeley alumni
Deaths from dementia in California
Deaths from Alzheimer's disease
Burials at Forest Lawn Memorial Park (Glendale)